Yahya Merchant (1903–1990) was an Indian Dawoodi Bohra architect. Among his designs are the Quaid-e-Azam Mausoleum for Muhammad Ali Jinnah in Karachi, and the Raudat Tahera Mausoleum for Syedna Taher Saifuddin in Mumbai.

References 

20th-century Indian architects
Dawoodi Bohras
Indian Ismailis
Artists from Mumbai
1903 births
Year of death missing
20th-century Indian educators
Educators from Maharashtra